The 2021 Deutschland Cup was the 32nd edition of the tournament, held between 11 and 14 November 2021.

Germany won the tournament for the eighth time.

Standings

Results
All times are local (UTC+1).

References

Deutschland Cup
Deutschland Cup
2021
Deutschland Cup